Gradient Analytics, Inc., founded in 1996 by Donn Vickrey and Dr. Carr Bettis as Camelback Research Alliance, Inc. and based in Scottsdale, Arizona, was an independent equity research company.

References

Companies based in Scottsdale, Arizona
Companies established in 1996
Financial services companies of the United States